The Bosun's Mate is a 1914 British silent comedy film directed by Harold M. Shaw and starring Mary Brough, Charles Rock and Wyndham Guise. It is an adaptation of a play by W. W. Jacobs.

Cast
 Mary Brough – Mrs. Walters
 Charles Rock
 Wyndham Guise – Ned Travers
 W.H. Berry – George Benn
 George Bellamy
 Judd Green
 John East
 Brian Daly

External links

1914 films
1914 comedy films
British comedy films
British films based on plays
Films based on works by W. W. Jacobs
Films directed by Harold M. Shaw
British silent short films
British black-and-white films
1910s English-language films
1910s British films
Silent comedy films